Hardy William Lindsay Nickerson (born January 5, 1994) is an American football linebacker who is currently a free agent. He played college football for 3 years at California and was a grad-transfer at Illinois where he played for his father Hardy Nickerson.

Professional career

Cincinnati Bengals

2017
Nickerson went undrafted during the 2017 NFL Draft. On April 30, 2017, the Cincinnati Bengals signed Nickerson to a three-year, $1.66 million contract. 

Throughout training camp, Nickerson competed for a roster spot against Brandon Bell, Bryson Albright, Paul Dawson, Jordan Evans, and Marquis Flowers.  Head coach Marvin Lewis named Nickerson a backup middle linebacker to begin the regular season, behind Kevin Minter .

He made his professional regular season debut during the Cincinnati Bengals’ season-opening 20-0 loss against the Baltimore Ravens. On September 28, 2017, the Cincinnati Bengals waived Nickerson and was signed him to their practice squad the next day. On October 16, 2017, the Cincinnati Bengals promoted Nickerson to their active roster. On November 14, 2017, the Cincinnati Bengals waived Nickerson, but re-signed him to the practice squad the next day. On November 18, 2017, Nickerson was promoted back to the active roster. On December 17, 2017, Nickerson earned his first career start after Vontaze Burfict and Kevin Minter sustained injuries. Nickerson recorded five combined tackles in his first career start as the Bengals lost at the Minnesota Vikings 34-7 in Week 15. In Week 17, he collected a season-high seven solo tackles and deflected a pass during a 31-27 victory at the Baltimore Ravens. He finished his rookie season in 2017 with 18 combined tackles (12 solo) and one pass deflection in 14 games and two starts.

2018
On January 8, 2018, the Cincinnati Bengals announced their decision to hire former Detroit Lions’ defensive coordinator Teryl Austin as the new defensive coordinator after it was left vacant by the departure of Paul Guenther to the Oakland Raiders. Nickerson entered training camp slated as a backup middle linebacker. He was named the backup middle linebacker to start the regular season, behind Preston Brown. In Week 11, Nickerson collected a season-high 11 combined tackles (eight solo) during a 24-21 loss at the Baltimore Ravens.

2019
On September 1, 2019, Nickerson was waived by the Bengals and re-signed to the practice squad. He was promoted to the active roster on November 15, 2019.

Minnesota Vikings 
Nickerson was signed by the Minnesota Vikings on August 18, 2020. He was waived on September 6, 2020, and re-signed to the practice squad two days later. He was elevated to the active roster on September 12 for the team's week 1 game against the Green Bay Packers, and reverted to the practice squad after the game. He was promoted to the active roster on September 22, 2020. He was waived on December 1, 2020, and re-signed to the practice squad two days later. He was promoted to the active roster again on December 12. In Week 16 against the New Orleans Saints on Christmas Day, Nickerson recorded his first career interception off a pass thrown by Drew Brees during the 52–33 loss.

Houston Texans
Nickerson signed with the Houston Texans on March 22, 2021. He was released on August 31, 2021 and re-signed to the practice squad. He was released on September 8, but he re-signed on Sept. 21. The Texans signed him to their active roster on November 3. He was placed on injured reserve on November 20.

Personal life
His father Hardy Nickerson is a former linebacker who played 16 seasons in the National Football League as a member of the Steelers, Buccaneers, Jaguars, and Packers. He was five-time Pro Bowl selection, four-time All-Pro selection and is a member on the NFL 1990s All-Decade Team.

References

External links
Illinois Fighting Illini bio
Cincinnati Bengals bio

1994 births
Living people
American football linebackers
California Golden Bears football players
Cincinnati Bengals players
Houston Texans players
Illinois Fighting Illini football players
Minnesota Vikings players
Players of American football from Oakland, California